Charlotte Louise Fullerton (born March 20) is an American writer of television, novels, comic books and video games.

Biography 
Fullerton graduated with a BA in cinema-television/production from the University of Southern California, and started her career in children's entertainment as an assistant at Fox Kids Network. Her Fox Kids Bartcasting campaign, featuring Bart Simpson taking over the network, garnered Fox Kids' On-Air Promotions department its first Promax International Gold Medallion Award nomination and win.

Fullerton served as the voice director, the post-production supervisor, and as a Foley artist on the short film Troops, a parody of Cops set in the Star Wars universe. In 2010, Troops was named the #1 Star Wars fan film of all time by Time magazine.

Fullerton is co-story editor and writer of Ben 10: Omniverse and has previously served as story editor of the Nicktoons' series Zevo-3  as well as the original Duel Masters for Hasbro and Cartoon Network. She has also written episodes for children's TV series, including My Little Pony: Friendship Is Magic, The Super Hero Squad Show, The Fairly OddParents, Ben 10: Ultimate Alien, Tutenstein, The 99, Kim Possible, Power Rangers, Ben 10: Alien Force, Generator Rex, Green Lantern: The Animated Series, and the CG movie, Care Bears to the Rescue (2010).

Fullerton is a two-time Emmy nominee: in 2012 for Outstanding Original Song – Children's and Animation on My Little Pony: Friendship Is Magic at The Hub, and in 2010 for Outstanding Writing in Animation on The Fairly OddParents at Nickelodeon.

Fullerton has authored several books for children and young adults. These include Cry of the Wolf (2001) in the Avalon: Web of Magic series as well as original stories and adaptations based on the Ben 10: Alien Force TV series, all for Scholastic, plus adaptations of the Sonic X TV series for Penguin.  She wrote the Ben 10: Alien Force talking interactive graphic novel for LeapFrog, and the Ben 10: Alien Force CN Action Pack comic book series for DC Comics. Fullerton has also written for an adult readership as a contributing editor for CFQ's pop culture national magazine, Geek Monthly, and is a featured essayist in the Benbella/Smart Pop book, Coffee at Luke's, which discusses the TV series, Gilmore Girls.

Fullerton's videogame writing credits include the Generator Rex console game  and numerous Ben 10 videogames for Activision, Konami, VTech, LeapFrog, and D3 Publisher for all of the major gaming platforms: Sony PlayStation 3, Sony PlayStation 2, Sony PlayStation Portable (PSP), Nintendo Wii U, Nintendo Wii, Nintendo Wii Ware, Nintendo 3DS, Nintendo DS, Microsoft Xbox 360, Microsoft Xbox Live Arcade, PC platforms, plus the VTech MobiGo and LeapFrog Leapster Explorer handheld educational gaming systems.

Fullerton is originally from Haverhill, Massachusetts. She is the widow of comic book and animation writer/producer, Dwayne McDuffie.

Screenwriting credits

Television
 Mighty Morphin Power Rangers (1996)
 Power Rangers Zeo (1997)
 Angela Anaconda (1999)
 Digimon Adventure 02 (2000)
 Firehouse Tales (2005)
 Tutenstein (2006)
 Kim Possible (2007)
 George of the Jungle (2007)
 Care Bears: Adventures in Care-a-Lot (2008)
 Ben 10: Alien Force (2008-2010)
 Angel Wars (2009)
 Storm Hawks (2009)
 The Super Hero Squad Show (2009-2011)
 The Fairly OddParents (2010)
 Ben 10: Ultimate Alien (2010-2012)
 My Little Pony: Friendship is Magic (2010-2013)
 Generator Rex (2011)
 Ben 10: Omniverse (2012-2014)
 Green Lantern: The Animated Series (2013)
 Avengers Assemble (2015)
 Thunderbirds Are Go (2015)
 Geronimo Stilton (2017)
 Dorothy And The Wizard Of Oz (2017)
 Hello Kitty And Friends: Super Cute Adventures (2020-2022)
 Young Justice (2022)

Film
 Care Bears: To the Rescue (2010)
 Barbie & Chelsea: The Lost Birthday (2021)

References

External links 
 
 

Living people
American children's writers
American comics writers
American fantasy writers
American women novelists
American science fiction writers
American television writers
American women screenwriters
American voice directors
USC School of Cinematic Arts alumni
Video game writers
Female comics writers
American women television writers
21st-century American novelists
Novelists from Massachusetts
American women children's writers
Women science fiction and fantasy writers
21st-century American women writers
Screenwriters from Massachusetts
21st-century American screenwriters
Year of birth missing (living people)